Tubulin polymerization-promoting protein is a protein that in humans is encoded by the TPPP gene.

This protein has been linked to multiple sclerosis myelin lesions and CSF abnormalities in multiple sclerosis patients.

This has also been linked to Parkinson's and Alzheimer's Disease

References

Further reading